The Kosovo national rugby sevens team is the national rugby sevens side representing Kosovo.

History
The Kosovo Rugby Federation was established in September 2018. A great role in its establishment has played the Rugby Community in Kosovo. Rugby community consists of people that come with different cultural backgrounds coming from different continents of the world. On 3 December 2021, Kosovo was accepted in Rugby Europe during their 103rd meeting.

Competitive record

Rugby Europe Sevens
On 8 April 2022, it was decided that Kosovo should be part of Rugby Europe Sevens in Conference 2 of the 2022 Rugby Europe Sevens Conference, together with Estonia, Malta, San Marino, Slovakia and Slovenia. On 11 June 2022, Kosovo made their debut in the Rugby Europe Sevens Conference with a 22–5 away defeat against Slovenia, which match was also the team's first-ever match. A day later, Kosovo achieved their first win in the Rugby Europe Sevens Conference, which was also the team's first-ever win, a 38–0 home win against Estonia.

Fixtures and results

2022

Players

Current squad
The following players have been called up for the 2022 Rugby Europe Sevens Conference.
The club listed is the club for which the player last played a competitive match prior to the call-up.

Head-to-head record

See also
Kosovo national rugby union team

References

External links
Kosovo Rugby Federation

National rugby sevens teams
R